Youlbung, New South Wales is a bounded rural locality of Gilgandra Shire and a civil parish of Gowen County, a cadastral division of New South Wales.

The parish is on the Terrebilie Creek and the nearest settlement of the parish is Tooraweenah, New South Wales to the south. The parish is on the traditional lands of the Weilwan Aboriginal people.

References

Localities in New South Wales
Geography of New South Wales
Central West (New South Wales)